Challengers of the Unknown is the title of a comic book series used on various occasions by DC Comics. Most of these series dealt with the original Challengers of the Unknown. The concept behind this team was a group of individuals surviving a disaster (a plane crash with the original group) and deciding to collectively do something with the "borrowed time" they have left.

On two occasions DC used the name and concept, with a new set of characters, as the basis for a new series. The first of these two, intended to be an ongoing series, was published from late 1996 to mid-1998. The second was a six-issue limited series published in 2004.

1996 series (volume 3)

Started as a part of DC's Weirdoverse group of titles, the 1996 series was published for a total of eighteen issues, cover dated February 1997 to July 1998. The characters were a mix of races and were, like the original group, the only survivors of a plane crash:
 Kenn Kawa: A man of Japanese heritage and originally a game designer.
 Clay Brody: A white male, originally a race car driver.
 Brenda Ruskin: A white woman, originally a physicist.
 Marlon Corbet: An African American man, originally the pilot of the plane that crashed.

The 1996 series was originally conceived as the basis for a television series that never came about, as writer Steven Grant revealed in 2000:

2004 series (volume 4)

The 2004 series was a six-issue limited series, written and drawn by Howard Chaykin. Unlike the other two versions this group didn't originate in a plane crash, instead, it was made up of survivors of a large scale terrorist attack in Long Beach, California:

Zach Dyamond
Tessa Crowne
Rydell Starr
Kendra Harte
Holden Crosse

Collected editions

References

External links

1997 comics debuts
2004 comics debuts
Comics by Howard Chaykin
DC Comics titles
DC Comics limited series